is a city located in Osaka Prefecture, Japan. , the city had an estimated population of 77,401 in 33417 households and a population density of 3000 persons per km2.

Geography
Katano is located in the northeast of Osaka prefecture. Forests occupy half of the city's area, and the Amano River runs north–south in the center.

Neighboring municipalities
Osaka Prefecture
Hirakata
Neyagawa
Shijōnawate
Nara Prefecture
Ikoma

Climate
Katano has a Humid subtropical climate (Köppen Cfa) characterized by warm summers and cool winters with light to no snowfall.  The average annual temperature in Katano is 13.9 °C. The average annual rainfall is 1456 mm with September as the wettest month. The temperatures are highest on average in August, at around 25.6 °C, and lowest in January, at around 3.9 °C.

Demographics
Per Japanese census data, the population of Katano has risen steadily over the past century.

History
The area of the modern city of Katano was within ancient Kawachi Province During the Heian period, the hills from Katano to part of Hirakata were called "Katano ga Hara" and were a hunting ground for the imperial family and were famous for cherry blossoms.  The villages of Katano and Iwafune were established within Katano District with the creation of the modern municipalities system on April 1, 1889.  On April 1, 1896, the area became part of Kitakawachi District, Osaka. The villages merged July 1, 1939 to form the town of Katano. Katano absorbed the neighboring village of Hoshida on April 1, 1955, and was elevated to city status on November 3, 1971.

Government
Katano has a mayor-council form of government with a directly elected mayor and a unicameral city council of 15 members. Katano contributes one member to the Osaka Prefectural Assembly. In terms of national politics, the city is part of Osaka 11th district of the lower house of the Diet of Japan.

Economy
Katano is a regional commercial center, and its economy is centered on agriculture.

Education
Katano has ten public elementary schools and four public middle schools operated by the city government and one public high school operated by the Osaka Prefectural Department of Education. There is also one private middle school and one private high school. The prefecture also operates one special education school for the handicapped.

Transportation

Railway
 JR West – Katamachi Line (Gakkentoshi Line)
  - 
 Keihan Electric Railway - Katano Line
  -  -  -

Highway

Sister city relations 
  Collingwood, Ontario, Canada - Sister city agreement concluded in 1981

Local attractions
 Botanical Gardens Faculty of Science Osaka City University

Notable people from Katano
Ikioi Shōta, sumo wrestler
Erika Matsuo, violinist
Kaichi Uchida, tennis player

References

External links
 
 I Love Katano

Cities in Osaka Prefecture
Katano, Osaka